Leptohyphes is a genus of little stout crawler mayflies in the family Leptohyphidae. There are about 18 described species in Leptohyphes.

Species
 Leptohyphes alleni Brusca, 1971
 Leptohyphes berneri Traver, 1958
 Leptohyphes brevissimus Eaton, 1892
 Leptohyphes brunneus Allen and Brusca, 1973
 Leptohyphes castaneus Allen, 1967
 Leptohyphes lestes Allen and Brusca, 1973
 Leptohyphes mandibulus Baumgardner, 2007
 Leptohyphes murdochi Allen, 1967
 Leptohyphes musseri Allen, 1967
 Leptohyphes nigripunctus Traver, 1943
 Leptohyphes peterseni Ulmer, 1920
 Leptohyphes pilosus Allen and Brusca, 1973
 Leptohyphes priapus Traver, 1958
 Leptohyphes sabinas Traver, 1958
 Leptohyphes spiculatus Allen and Brusca, 1973
 Leptohyphes tarsos Allen and Murvosh, 1987
 Leptohyphes vulturnus Allen, 1978
 Leptohyphes zalope Traver, 1958

References

Further reading

 

Mayfly genera